Carlos Vassallo Rojas (26 June 1908−29 July 1983) was a Chilean politician and lawyer who served as minister and ambassador.

Biography
Vasallo Rojas was Minister of Public Health and Social Welfare during Carlos Ibáñez del Campo's second government.

Later, he was Undersecretary of State in the Ministry of Foreign Affairs and Deputy Minister of Foreign Affairs. During Salvador Allende's overthrow, he was ambassador to Italy. Similarly, during the first years of Augusto Pinochet's regime, it was denied his return to Chile.

In early 1982, Vassallo returned to his homeland and died on 28 July 1983 aged 75.

Honors
 Order of Merit of the Federal Republic of Germany

References

External links
 Vassallo re-entry request
 Profile at Annales de la República

1908 births
1983 deaths
20th-century Chilean lawyers
Chilean people of Italian descent
Grand Crosses with Star and Sash of the Order of Merit of the Federal Republic of Germany